Middleton is a scattered settlement in Shropshire with a chapel (Holy Trinity) and a former schoolhouse. It was once much more populated but went into decline once mining ended in the area. It is situated in the civil parish of Chirbury with Brompton, in the west of the county.

Middleton is a parish ward within that parish, returning 3 councillors. Historically it was a township of the hundred of Chirbury. The ecclesiastical parish is known as Middleton-in-Chirbury.

To the north is the hamlet of Rorrington, to the south the small village of Priestweston, both also in the parish of Chirbury with Brompton.

See also
Listed buildings in Chirbury with Brompton

References

Villages in Shropshire